Mohit Malik (born 11 January 1984) is an Indian actor. He is known for his work in Hindi television. His popular television roles include Bharat in Banoo Main Teri Dulhann, Samrat Singh Rathore in Doli Armaano Ki and Sikandar Singh Gill in Kullfi Kumarr Bajewala. He was seen as a contestant in Colors TV's stunt-based reality show Khatron Ke Khiladi 12 where he became the 2nd runner up.

Career
Malik made his television debut with TV show Miilee as Aaoni on Star Plus. After that he did various TV shows like Betiyaan Apni Ya Paraya Dhan, Pari Hoon Main, Banoo Main Teri Dulhann, Godh Bharaai, Durgesh Nandinii,
Mann Kee Awaaz Pratigya and Phulwa. He was also the contestant of Nach Baliye 4. He has also done Suvreen Guggal – Topper of The Year as Rehan Charles. 

He also worked in Doli Armaano Ki as Samrat Singh Rathore where his acting talent was appreciated the most. In 2015, Mohit Malik participated in Jhalak Dikhhla Jaa and got the third place. From June 2016 to Jan 2017 He hosted Savdhaan India.
In 2018, Mohit is acting as lead role in musical show Kullfi Kumarr Bajewala, as Sikandar Singh Gill, which broadcasts on Star Plus.
In August 2020, he is portraying Dhruv Jaiswal in StarPlus's Lockdown Ki Love Story.

It was reported that, he was about to play the role of "Viaan" in Katha Ankahee, but later on Adnan Khan was finalized to play the lead role.

Personal life
Malik is a Punjabi.

On 1 December 2010, he married actress and co-star from Miilee, Addite Shirwaikar Malik. In December 2020, the couple announced that they are expecting their first child in Dec 2020, and on  May 2021 they became parents to a baby boy named Ekbir Malik.

Filmography

Television

Special appearances

Web series

Awards

See also
 List of Indian television actors

References

External links

1982 births
Living people
Punjabi people
People from Delhi
Indian male television actors
Indian male soap opera actors
Reality dancing competition contestants
Participants in Indian reality television series
Fear Factor: Khatron Ke Khiladi participants